Cornborough railway station was a minor railway station or halt/request stop in north Devon, close to Westward Ho!, serving holiday makers visiting the cliff walks and nearby beach. It lay  3 miles and 30 chains from Bideford Quay.

History 
As stated, the halt was built to serve passengers aiming to walk on the Torrs, etc. It was in a very exposed area and trains were often reduced to a snail's pace due to high winds in winter.

Infrastructure
Cornborough Cliffs Halt had a platform, but no shelter and was sited on the up side of the line next to the footpath at the waters edge. The line ran through rock cut cuttings up to this point. No sidings or freight facilities were provided. It was situated 3 miles and 30 chains from Bideford Quay.

Micro history
In January 1901, the first train, with one carriage, ran from Bideford to Northam carrying a few friends of the Directors.

References 

Notes

Sources

 Baxter, Julia & Jonathan (1980). The Bideford, Westward Ho! and Appledore railway 1901-1917. Pub. Chard. .
 Christie, Peter (1995). North Devon History. The Lazarus Press. .
 Garner, Rod (2008). The Bideford, Westward Ho! & Appledore Railway. Pub. Kestrel Railway Books. .
 Griffith, Roger (1969). The Bideford, Westward Ho! and Appledore Railway. School project and personal communications. Bideford Museum.
 Jenkins, Stanley C. (1993). The Bideford, Westward Ho! and Appledore Railway. Oxford : Oakwood Press. .
 Stuckey, Douglas (1962). The Bideford, Westward Ho! and Appledore Railway 1901-1917. Pub. West Country Publications.

Disused railway stations in Devon
Former Bideford, Westward Ho! and Appledore Railway stations
Railway stations in Great Britain opened in 1901
Railway stations in Great Britain closed in 1917
Torridge District